El Paso Police Department (EPPD) is the principal law enforcement agency serving El Paso, Texas, United States. As of Fiscal Year 2014, the agency had an annual budget of more than $118 million and employed around 1,300 personnel, including approximately 1,100 officers. Greg Allen was appointed as the EPPD's chief of police in March 2008 and served until his death in January 2023.

History

Early history

The early history of the department is difficult to study. Many older newspaper accounts are inaccurate and documents from before about 1950 were lost in a fire. Newspaper accounts were often heavily exaggerated for local entertainment value or to bolster a "wild west" image for the city to readers in the eastern United States.

The formal establishment date for the department is 1884, but historical references to the department exist before that official date. During this period, the department employed a series of City Marshals who were known to be as rough and wild as the criminals in the frontier town, with shootouts and small scale wars being much more common than today for example in 1881 the "Four Dead in Five Seconds Gunfight." . Some marshals were involved in confrontations out of town including the El Paso Salt War and the Lincoln County War. It was also not unheard of to have local, state and federal law enforcement at odds, including armed confrontations.

In 1889, the police department had its first appointed chief, T.C. Lyons. Lyons had previously served in the Fire Department and was not the typical "rough" character previously known in El Paso law enforcement. His tenure may mark the beginning of the more modern and civilized approach to law enforcement in the city.

20th century
Newspaper accounts show the police starting to use motor vehicles for law enforcement in 1909. Fingerprinting began in 1915. By the 1920s, pictures are available showing some of these advancements. Radar was introduced for speed enforcement in 1955, and the department formed its first SWAT unit in 1972.

In 1946, the department hired its first African American officer (the official website states that four African American veterans were appointed in 1945) However, between that time and the 1970s-1980s, black officers were not allowed to do many of the things other officers could do, including arrests, driving vehicles or writing reports. The current chief, Greg Allen, is the department's first African American chief. The department started actively recruiting women in the 1940s, but none actually served as officers until 1974. However, during this time women actively served as "meter maids" or worked in the jail. Today, several women have achieved high ranks in the police department and the department has hosted the Women in Law Enforcement conference multiple times.

In 1972, the department opened a second station to serve the east side and parts of the lower valley. Growth since then has increased the number of stations to five (not including the central command). In the 1990s and early 2000s, the department has implemented many other advancements, including computers, cameras and non-lethal weapons like the Taser.

Recent history
Community policing has been an important goal of the police department in recent years. A 2011 study showed that police officers were spending 75% of their time responding to calls and 25% of their time on administrative work with little time left over for community patrols. Since the study, the department implemented several reforms to free up officer time, including privatized prisoner transport from stations to the jail, a call center for non-urgent reports and changes in the ways officers are called to testify. The goal is for "60-20-20" or 60% of time on reactive work (responding to calls), 20% of time on administrative tasks and 20% of time for community patrols and community involvement.

In 2012, the City Council honored Lt. Charles Harvey for serving in the department for 45 years. Harvey is the longest-serving member of the department and currently presides over the Criminal Investigation Division and Tactical Unit at the Central Regional Command. He told an El Paso Times reporter that he does not plan to retire any time soon.

Despite being near the border with Mexico and across the river from Ciudad Juarez (one of the most violent cities in the western hemisphere), El Paso is a very safe city with low crime. This may be caused by the high immigrant population in the city and the generally immigrant-welcoming environment. El Paso has been in the top three large cities (500,000+ population) with the lowest crime rates since 1997, and took the #1 spot for 2010-2013.

Possible future consolidation with county sheriff's office
For years, city officials and officials in the El Paso County government have been discussing a possible consolidation of EPPD with the El Paso County Sheriff's Office to reduce costs and improve law enforcement capability in the area. Proponents of this change include current sheriff Richard Wiles, city manager Joyce Wilson and others. Possible methods of consolidation include a Las Vegas style merger with the sheriff in charge of all aspects of policing or a split consolidation with the sheriff in charge of some things and a police chief in charge of others. All El Paso County sheriffs since 1985 have been former EPPD officers, including current Sheriff Wiles, who was formerly EPPD's chief.

Obstacles to consolidation include questions of who would control the metropolitan agency, training levels and the complexity of combining the departments.

As of late 2013, the process of consolidation has not gone forward beyond talks.

In popular culture/media
Around 2008, forward e-mails titled "El Paso Police Pinata" or "One cop, three bad guys" were in circulation. The e-mails included graphic and bloody pictures of three men who were apparently shot by a police officer who was standing over them with his firearm. The e-mail claimed that the men came from Ciudad Juarez and attempted to rob an off-duty El Paso Police officer, who killed them all in retaliation. One image is captioned "Do you realize how much the US taxpayer saved by not having to prosecute these worthless thugs?". Internet forum users and bloggers determined that the incident in question likely occurred in Brazil years earlier and certainly did not occur in El Paso.

In 2012, F/X Networks filmed portions of their new show, The Bridge, in El Paso. For one scene, Sheriff Richard Wiles was dressed as an El Paso patrol officer guarding a crime scene. Sheriff Wiles (a former EPPD chief) helped the show's creators with their research so they could more accurately portray law enforcement in Juarez and El Paso.

Specialized units
*Regional Operations (Patrol)
Criminal Investigations
Intelligence
Special Traffic Investigations
DWI Task Force
Canine
*COMSAR

*Training/Academy

*Bomb Squad

*SWAT

*Dignitary Protection

*Internal Affairs
Special Investigations Group

Patrol divisions
Central Regional Command
Pebble Hills Regional Command
Mission Valley Regional Command
Northeast Regional Command
Westside Regional Command

Ranks

Fallen officers
Since 1883, 31 municipal officers have died while on duty.

Houston is not listed on the official department website, but is listed on the Officer Down Memorial Page.

Misconduct

In June 2009, Sergeant Miguel Lucero began an inappropriate relationship with a female student at a Riverside High School where he was assigned. He later pleaded guilty to “Improper Relationship Between an Educator and Student.” He was sentenced to 400 hours of community service and a fine.

In 2012, seventeen officers were indicted on charges of faking records to gain overtime pay. In October of that year, one officer named Scott McFarland pleaded guilty to 35 counts. He was fined and ordered to undergo drug and alcohol testing.

See also
List of law enforcement agencies in Texas

References

External links
El Paso Police Department
El Paso Municipal Peace Officers Association
El Paso Police Foundation

Police
Municipal police departments of Texas